The Albany Building is a 19th-century Grade II* listed building located on Old Hall Street, in Liverpool, Merseyside, England. Built originally as a meeting place for cotton brokers, it has since been converted into apartments.

History
The Albany Building is located on Old Hall Street, at the western edge of Liverpool's city centre, and a short walk from Moorfields rail station. Constructed in the 1856 at the height of the city's expansion, it is one of Liverpool's most highly regarded works of architecture. The Albany Building was built under the instruction of local banker and race horse owner Richard Naylor and designed by J.K. Colling.  It was built as a meeting place for cotton brokers, and contained offices and meeting rooms, together with warehousing facilities in the basement.  It is one of the earliest examples of Victorian offices in Liverpool.  The central courtyard is uncovered, and provided good mutual light for the brokers to examine their cotton samples.  The building gained Grade II listed status on 12 July 1966 . During the 1970s to 1980's it was mainly used as offices, warehousing and storage. The building was sympathetically renovated and converted into apartments in 2004–05.

Architecture
The building is in three storeys plus a basement, and its front on Old Hall Street has eleven bays. The basement is constructed in rusticated granite, the ground floor in rusticated ashlar, and the upper storeys in brick with stone dressings.  The round-arched entrance is in the central bay, and consists of a granite surround with a keystone, carvings in the spandrels.  Over this is a frieze and a segmental pediment.  The ground floor windows are three-light sashes, with segmental heads and keystones.  Above the windows is a cornice.  The first floor windows also have segmental heads; these contain carved archivolts and tympana.  The windows in the top floor are smaller, with stone architraves and keystones.  Along the top of the building is a carved frieze, a cornice supported by brackets, and a balustraded parapet.  The side elevations are plainer, and still include cast iron hoists.  The main entrance contains the original cast iron gates.  Inside is a coffered and barrel vaulted passage leading to the central courtyard, containing red granite columns and decorated with elaborate plasterwork.

Today
Today the Albany comprises 137 apartments in total, made up of two and three-bedroom luxury apartments and penthouses. The building has a 24-hour concierge service and features a bespoke car parking stacker system designed and installed by Wöhr Parking, that makes use of a short space to store 84 cars. The courtyard can be seen from through the glass doors from the street and boasts the largest outdoor Swarovski crystal chandeliers in Europe. The courtyard draws admiration from many passers-by.  The Albany was used in the filming of the China Melville TV adaptation The City & the City. Ormond Street is a popular spot for filming and the building has appeared in a number of recent TV productions, The Ipcress File, The Irregulars, The Five and The Curse.

See also
Grade II* listed buildings in Merseyside
Architecture of Liverpool

References

Grade II* listed buildings in Liverpool